The Haddingtonshire by-election was a Parliamentary by-election held on 19 April 1911. It returned one Member of Parliament (MP)  to the House of Commons of the Parliament of the United Kingdom, elected by the first past the post voting system.

Previous result

Candidates

Result

Aftermath
In 1912, after three unsuccessful attempts, the local Conservative Association replaced Blyth with a new candidate, Mansfield Hunter, who was replaced in 1913 by H. P. Macmillan. A general election was due to take place by the end of 1915. By the autumn of 1914, the following candidates had been selected to contest that election. Due to the outbreak of the First World War, the election never took place as scheduled.

The constituency was merged into the new Berwick & Haddington constituency for the 1918 elections. Tennant had represented the Berwick part. Hope was given the Coalition government coupon.

References

 Craig, F. W. S. (1974). British parliamentary election results 1885-1918 (1 ed.). London: Macmillan.
 Who's Who: www.ukwhoswho.com
 Debrett's House of Commons 1916

By-elections to the Parliament of the United Kingdom in Scottish constituencies
1911 elections in the United Kingdom
1911 in Scotland
1910s elections in Scotland
Politics of East Lothian